Vigrahapala may refer to:

 Vigrahapala (Chahamana dynasty), 10th century Chahamana ruler of north-western India
 Vigrahapala I, 9th century Pala ruler of eastern India
 Vigrahapala II, 10th century Pala ruler of eastern India
 Vigrahapala III, 11th century Pala ruler of eastern India